The 2000 Meath Senior Football Championship was the 108th edition of the Meath GAA's premier club Gaelic football tournament for senior graded teams in County Meath, Ireland. The tournament consists of 16 teams, with the winner going on to represent Meath in the Leinster Senior Club Football Championship. The championship starts with a group stage and then progresses to a knock out stage.  
 
Skryne were the defending champions after they defeated Dunshaughlin in the previous years final, and

Syddan were promoted after claiming the 1999 Meath Intermediate Football Championship title, their second Intermediate win.

On 17 September 2000, Dunshaughlin claimed their first ever and also the first of three successive Senior Championship titles with a 1-19 to 2-6 win over Kilmainhamwood. The game was broadcast live across Ireland on TG4. Dermot Kealy raised the Keegan Cup for Dunshaughlin while his brother Richie claimed the 'Man of the Match' award.

Moynalvey were relegated after 17 years in the senior grade.
Blackhall Gaels were also relegated after 2 years as a senior club.

Team changes
The following teams have changed division since the 1999 championship season.

To S.F.C.
Promoted from I.F.C.
 Syddan  -  (Intermediate Champions)

From S.F.C.
Relegated to I.F.C.
 Carnaross
 Slane

Group stage

Group A

Round 1:
 Seneschalstown +1, -1 Walterstown, Pairc Tailteann, 30/4/2000, 
 Summerhill 2-5, 0-9 Kilmainhamwood, Dunderry, 30/4/2000,
 Moynalvey  -  Bye,

Round 2:
 Moynalvey 0-11, 0-5 Seneschalstown, 13/5/2000,
 Summerhill 1-8, 0-11 Walterstown, Trim, 13/5/2000,
 Kilmainhamwood  -  Bye,

Round 3:
 Kilmainhamwood 0-11, 0-9 Moynalvey, Walterstown, 18/6/2000,
 Summerhill 0-14, 1-9 Seneschalstown, Dunsany, 16/6/2000,
 Walterstown  -  Bye,

Round 4:
 Walterstown 0-15, 1-4 Moynalvey, Summerhill, 9/7/2000,
 Kilmainhamwood 1-13, 1-10 Seneschalstown, Pairc Tailteann, 9/7/2000,
 Summerhill  -  Bye,

Round 5:
 Summerhill 1-13, 1-8 Moynalvey, Dunsany, 22/7/2000,
 Kilmainhamwood 2-5, 0-6 Walterstown, Pairc Tailteann, 22/7/2000,
 Seneschalstown  -  Bye,

Relegation Play Off:
 Seneschalstown 2-11, 0-11 Moynalvey, Dunsany, 3/10/2000,

Group B

Round 1:
 Trim 2-9, 0-13 Ballinlough, Athboy, 13/5/2000,
 Navan O'Mahonys 0-12, 0-9 Oldcastle, Kells, 22/4/2000,
 Dunderry  -  Bye,

Round 2:
 Trim 2-11, 0-9 Navan O'Mahonys, Dunsany, 9/6/2000,
 Dunderry 2-7, 1-10 Ballinlough, Kells, 9/6/2000,
 Oldcastle  -  Bye,

Round 3:
 Ballinlough 2-13, 2-8 Navan O'Mahonys, Kells, 17/6/2000,
 Dunderry 0-10, 0-7 Oldcastle, Kells, 23/6/2000,
 Trim  -  Bye,

Round 4:
 Oldcastle 2-11, 2-9 Ballinlough, Kells, 9/7/2000,
 Dunderry 1-16, 1-11 Trim, Dunsany, 9/7/2000,
 Navan O'Mahonys  -  Bye,

Round 5:
 Trim 1-11, 1-6 Oldcastle, Athboy, 20/7/2000,
 Dunderry 0-10, 1-5 Navan O'Mahonys, Pairc Tailteann, 20/7/2000,
 Ballinlough  -  Bye,

Preliminary Relegation Playoff:
 Oldcastle 2-7, 0-8 Navan O'Mahonys, Kells, 3/10/2000,

Group C

Round 1:
 Syddan 0-8, 0-8 St. Peter's Dunboyne, Walterstown, 29/4/2000,
 Simonstown Gaels +2, -2 Gaeil Colmcille, Pairc Tailteann, 30/4/2000,

Round 2:
 Syddan 1-9, 1-9 Gaeil Colmcille, Carlanstown, 16/6/2000,
 Simonstown Gaels 0-12, 0-10 St. Peter's Dunboyne, Pairc Tailteann, 18/6/2000,

Round 3:
 Syddan 5-12, 0-9 Simonstown Gaels, Pairc Tailteann, 9/7/2000,
 St. Peter's Dunboyne 1-13, 1-4 Gaeil Colmcille, Walterstown, 9/7/2000,

Group D

Round 1:
 Dunshaughlin 0-21, 0-7 Blackhall Gaels, Skryne, 30/4/2000,
 Skryne 3-15, 1-7 Cortown, Pairc Tailteann, 29/4/2000,

Round 2:
 Skryne 2-12, 2-9 Dunshaughlin, Pairc Tailteann, 18/6/2000,
 Cortown 0-14, 0-13 Blackhall Gaels, Bective, 16/6/2000,

Round 3:
 Dunshaughlin 6-11, 0-8 Cortown, Trim, 7/7/2000,
 Skryne 3-11, 0-11 Blackhall Gaels, Dunboyne, 8/7/2000,

Knock-out Stage

Relegation Play Off

 Gaeil Colmcille 2-14, 1-4 Moynalvey, Walterstown, 1/10/2000,
 Navan O'Mahonys 1-6, 0-9 Blackhall Gaels, Dunsany, 1/10/2000,
 Navan O'Mahonys 1-17, 2-13 Blackhall Gaels, Dunsany, 15/10/2000, (AET)

Finals

Quarter-final:
 Dunshaughlin 0-17, 1-6 Syddan, Pairc Tailteann, 28/7/2000, 
 Trim 1-9, 1-4 Summerhill, Pairc Tailteann, 13/8/2000,
 Kilmainhamwood 1-9, 0-12 Dunderry, Pairc Tailteann, 4/9/2000,
 Skryne 2-9, 0-10 Simonstown Gaels, Pairc Tailteann, 1/8/2000,

Quarter-final Replay:
 Kilmainhamwood 3-8, 1-9 Dunderry, 20/8/2000,

Semi-final:
 Dunshaughlin 2-11, 0-12 Trim, Pairc Tailteann, 2/9/2000,
 Kilmainhamwood 3-12, 1-13 Skryne, Pairc Tailteann, 3/9/2000,

Final:
 Dunshaughlin 1-19, 2-6 Kilmainhamwood, Pairc Tailteann, 17/9/2000,

References

External links

Meath Senior Football Championship
Meath Senior Football Championship